Elections were held in the state of Western Australia on 21 October 1914 to elect 50 members to the Western Australian Legislative Assembly. The Labor party, led by Premier John Scaddan, retained government against the opposition conservative Liberal Party led by Opposition Leader Frank Wilson, though with only the barest of majorities. The election also saw the emergence of the Western Australian Country Party, which had been formed at a conference of the Farmers and Settlers Association the previous year to fight for rural interests, and won eight seats at the election.

The fragility of the Labor Party's majority was demonstrated when, a year later, Labor member Joseph Gardiner's seat was declared vacant on account of his non-attendance and a Liberal was elected in his stead, and Labor became a minority government when on 18 December 1915, Bertie Johnston resigned from the Labor Party and became an independent. On 27 July 1916, the Scaddan Ministry was defeated and Wilson became the new Premier.

Key dates

Results

|}

Notes:
 The Labor Party's total of 26 seats includes 12 which were uncontested, representing 39,731 of the 214,741 enrolled voters. The Liberal and Country parties won one seat each uncontested—the Liberal member (Arthur Male, Kimberley) representing 1,663 enrolled voters, and the Country member (Alfred Piesse, Electoral district of Toodyay) representing 4,801 enrolled voters.

See also
 Members of the Western Australian Legislative Assembly, 1911–1914
 Members of the Western Australian Legislative Assembly, 1914–1917

References

Elections in Western Australia
1914 elections in Australia
1910s in Western Australia
October 1914 events